The Louis Ducros House (also known as the Plant-Ducros House) is a historic home in Clearwater, Florida. It is located at 1324 South Fort Harrison Street. On July 2, 1979, it was added to the U.S. National Register of Historic Places.

In 2004, it was purchased and shortly thereafter moved to 622 Belleview Boulevard.

It was removed from the National Register on September 2, 2009.

References

External links
 Pinellas County listings at National Register of Historic Places
 Florida's Office of Cultural and Historical Programs
 Pinellas County listings
 Louis Ducros House

Houses on the National Register of Historic Places in Florida
Louis Ducros House
Former National Register of Historic Places in Florida
Buildings and structures in Clearwater, Florida
Houses in Pinellas County, Florida